Hydnellum fuligineoviolaceum is a species of tooth fungus in the family Bankeraceae. It was originally described in 1874 by Hungarian mycologist Károly Kalchbrenner as Hydnum fuligineoviolaceum, in Elias Fries's work Hymenomycetes europaei. Narcisse Théophile Patouillard transferred it to the genus Sarcodon in 1900. Sarcodon talpa, published by Rudolph Arnold Maas Geesteranus in 1967, is a synonym.

In 2004 Hydnellum fuligineoviolaceum was one of 33 species proposed for protection under the Bern Convention by the European Council for Conservation of Fungi.

References

External links 
 

Fungi described in 1874
Fungi of Europe
fuligineoviolaceum